Taylor McQuiston Fry (born August 1, 1981) is a former American child actress. On film, Fry appeared in roles in Die Hard, North, and A Little Princess. On television, she has starring roles in Nightingales, Get a Life and Kirk. Fry graduated from Notre Dame High School in 1999, along with fellow actors Rami Malek and Rachel Bilson. She later attended and graduated from the University of California, Santa Barbara in 2003, where she became an avid Ultimate Frisbee player.

Filmography

Film

Television

References

External links

1981 births
20th-century American actresses
Living people
Actresses from California
American child actresses
American film actresses
American television actresses
University of California, Santa Barbara alumni
People from San Mateo, California
21st-century American women